Tianji is a town in Funan County, Anhui. , it administers three residential neighborhoods: Tianji, Dongyue, and Sunzhai, as well as the following nine villages:
Zhaowu Village
Chengzhai Village
Zhangji Village
Yangzhai Village
Renmiao Village
Wangda Village
Panglao Village
Zhaolao Village
Liulin Village

References

Funan County
Towns in Anhui